The interjection Ayo; is a common variation of the word Yo!.

Ayo, Ayọ, Ayọ̀ and AYO may also refer to:

People
Ayọ  is a common Yoruba given name, it can be given to a female and a male. Ayọ in Yoruba means Joy. 
 Ayo Akinola, American-Canadian soccer player
 Ayo Aderinwale, Nigerian diplomat
 Ayo & Teo, American dancers
 Ayo Bankole, Nigerian composer
 Ayo Dosunmu (born 1999), American basketball player
 Ayo Fayose, Nigerian politician
 Ayo Ogunsheye, Nigerian academic
 Ayo Oni, Nigerian politician
 Ayo Rosiji, Nigerian politician
 Ayo Shonaiya, Nigerian film producer
 Ayo Adesanya, Nigerian actress
 Ayo (singer) (born 1980), German actress and singer
 Ay-O (born 1931), Japanese painter from Fluxus
 Genoveva Añonma, also known as Ayo, (born 1989), Equatoguinean footballer
 Ayo Makun, Nigerian comedian

Places
Ayo Rock Formations, a geological feature of the island of Aruba
Juan de Ayolas Airport (IATA Code: AYO), in Ayolas, Paraguay

Music

Orchestras
Adelaide Youth Orchestra, an Adelaide-based musical youth organisation, known as AYO
Australian Youth Orchestra, an Australian national musical youth organisation, known as AYO

Albums
Ayo (Wizkid album), 2014 album by Nigerian artist Wizkid
Ayo (Bomba Estéreo album), 2017 album by Colombian band Bomba Estéreo
Ayo (Ayo album), 2017 album by German singer Ayọ

Songs
"Ayo" (Chris Brown and Tyga song)
"Ayo!", 2006 song by Mýa
"A-Yo" (Lady Gaga song)
"A-Yo" (Method Man & Redman song)
"A-Yo", by Jinusean from the 2001 album The Reign
"Ayo", by Andre Nickatina from the 2002 album Hell's Kitchen
"A-Yo", by SHINee from the 2010 album  Lucifer
"Ayo", by Andy Mineo from the 2013 album Heroes for Sale
"Ayo", by Simi from the 2019 album Omo Charlie Champagne, Vol. 1
"Ayo", by Baltimore rapper Bossman from the soundtrack album And All the Pieces Matter for HBO series The Wire

Others
AYO Foods, an American company making West African foods
"Ayo Technology", 2007 single by 50 Cent featuring Justin Timberlake
Ayoreo language (ISO 639-3 ayo), a language spoken in Paraguay and Bolivia
ayo, shortened name for at least two African mancala games:
 ayoayo
 oware
Tetrastigma harmandii, common name of a Filipino plant in the genus Tetrastigma, known for its edible fruit

Yoruba given names